Julian Cassander Work (September 25, 1910—June 15, 1995) was an arranger and composer.

Work was born in Nashville, Tennessee to a family of professional musicians. His grandfather, John Wesley Work (1848-1923) was a composer and arranger for the Fisk Jubilee Singers; his father, John Wesley Work Jr. (1871-1925) was the first African-American collector of folk songs and spirituals, and also a choral director, educator and songwriter; his brother John Wesley Work III (1901-1967) was a composer, educator, choral director, musicologist and scholar of African-American folklore and music; his mother, Agnes Hayes Work, was a singer who also helped train the Fisk Jubilee Singers.

Work studied music with local teacher Mary E. Chamberlain and was involved in musical activities from an early age, participating in neighborhood musical groups and performing as a jazz pianist. He studied composition with his brother John Wesley Work III while attending Fisk University, where he majored in sociology. By 1929 he had moved to New York City and was playing piano on the radio. He became a staff arranger for CBS Radio, becoming one of the first Black American composers to write music for radio and television. He was also the sole music arranger for the Voice of Firestone on radio and television.

Work married Kathryn Holliday in 1953.  Upon his retirement they moved to Tolland, Massachusetts where he died.

Partial list of compositions
Wanderlust (1938)
Myriorama by Night (orchestra, ca. 1946)
Portraits from the Bible (1956)
Autumn Walk (1957)
Processional Hymn (1957)
Driftwood Patterns (1961)
Stand the Storm (1963)
Reflections, Poems of Praise
Forest Images

References

External links
The CBS Collection of Manuscript Scores in the Music Division of the New York Public Library for the Performing Arts (contains over 270 scores arranged and orchestrated by Julian Work)
Invisible No More: Julian Work (blog post)

1910 births
1995 deaths
African-American classical composers
American classical composers
African-American male classical composers
American male classical composers
Musicians from Nashville, Tennessee
Fisk University alumni
CBS people
20th-century African-American people